Richard Browne (born 1962) is an Irish retired hurler who played as a full-back for the Cork senior team.

Born in Blackrock, County Cork, Browne first played competitive hurling in his youth. He arrived on the inter-county scene at the age of twenty when he first linked up with the Cork under-21 team. He made his senior debut during the 1986 championship. Browne subsequently became a regular member of the starting fifteen and won one All-Ireland medal.

At club level Browne is a one-time championship medallist with Blackrock.

Browne's brothers, Alan and John, also enjoyed All-Ireland success with Cork.

Throughout his career Browne made 14 championship appearances. His retirement came following the conclusion of the 1991 championship.

Honours

Team

Blackrock
Cork Senior Hurling Championship (1): 1985

University College Cork
Fitzgibbon Cup (2): 1984, 1985

Cork
All-Ireland Senior Hurling Championship (1): 1986
Munster Senior Hurling Championship (1): 1986
National Hurling League (2): 1979–80, 1990–81

References

1962 births
Living people
Blackrock National Hurling Club hurlers
UCC hurlers
Cork inter-county hurlers
All-Ireland Senior Hurling Championship winners